In the 2021–22 season, Étoile Sportive du Sahel is competing in the Ligue 1 for the 67th season, as well as the Tunisian Cup.  It is their 67th consecutive season in the top flight of Tunisian football. They are competing in Ligue 1, the Champions League and the Tunisian Cup. On February 17, The Tunisian Ministry of Sports announced in an official statement, the resumption of the local football league competition in the presence of the fans after a long absence that extended over the past two years due to the COVID-19 pandemic in Tunisia, which imposed the holding of competitions behind closed doors, The new procedures apply to the competitions of the opening round of the second leg of the Ligue Professionnelle 1, with 50% distributed among the fans of the two teams.

Squad list
Players and squad numbers last updated on 13 August 2021.Note: Flags indicate national team as has been defined under FIFA eligibility rules. Players may hold more than one non-FIFA nationality.

Pre-season

Competitions

Overview

{| class="wikitable" style="text-align: center"
|-
!rowspan=2|Competition
!colspan=8|Record
!rowspan=2|Started round
!rowspan=2|Final position / round
!rowspan=2|First match	
!rowspan=2|Last match
|-
!
!
!
!
!
!
!
!
|-
| Ligue 1 (first round)

|  
| 3rd
| 28 October 2021
| 13 April 2022
|-
| Ligue 1 (championship round)

|  
| To be confirmed
| 29 April 2022
| In Progress
|-
| Tunisian Cup

| Round of 32 
| To be confirmed
| In Progress
| In Progress
|-
| Champions League

| Second round
| Group stage
| 16 October 2021
| 1 April 2022
|-
! Total

|bgcolor=silver colspan=4|

Ligue 1

First round (Group B)

League table

Results summary

Results by round

Matches

Championship round

Table

Results summary

Results by round

Tunisian Cup

Champions League

Second round

Group stage

Group C

Squad information

Playing statistics

|-

|-
! colspan=14 style=background:#dcdcdc; text-align:center| Players transferred out during the season

Goalscorers

Includes all competitive matches. The list is sorted alphabetically by surname when total goals are equal.

Transfers

In

Out

Notes

References

2021-22
Tunisian football clubs 2021–22 season
2021–22 CAF Champions League participants seasons